Casarin is a surname. Notable people with this surname include:

 Carlos Escobar Casarin (born 1990), Chilean football defender
 Paolo Casarin (born 1940), Italian former football referee 
 Vittorio Casarin (born 1950), Italian politician from Veneto

See also 

Horacio Casarín Garcilazo (1918–2005), Mexican football player and coach
Casarini

Italian-language surnames